Veil's Visit: a Taste of Hap and Leonard is a collection of stories and excerpts by American author Joe R. Lansdale featuring his longtime protagonists Hap Collins and Leonard Pine. The eponymous first story was co-written by longtime Lansdale friend Andrew Vachss and ends with Lansdale "interviewing" his two heroes. This book was published by Subterranean Press as a limited edition hardcover and trade paperback and is long out of print. The interview and the stories "Veil's Visit" and "Death by Chili" were reprinted in the collections Hap and Leonard (2016) and The Big Book of Hap and Leonard (2018).

Table of contents
Introduction by Andrew Vachss
"The Happy Accident of Hap and Leonard" by Joe R. Lansdale
"Veil's Visit" by Joe R. Lansdale and Andrew Vachss
"Death by Chili" by Joe R. Lansdale

Excerpts by Joe R. Lansdale
Notes on the excerpts
Savage Season
Mucho Mojo
The Two-Bear Mambo
Bad Chili
Rumble Tumble
Captains Outrageous
Joe R. Lansdale interviews Hap Collins and Leonard Pine

References

External links
Author's Official Website
Publisher's Website
Andrew Vachss Official Website

Short story collections by Joe R. Lansdale
American crime novels
1999 short story collections
Works by Joe R. Lansdale
1999 American novels
Subterranean Press books